Josepha Abiertas (1894–1929) was a Filipino lawyer and feminist. She was the first woman to graduate with a degree from the Philippine Law School.

Abiertas was born in Capiz in the Philippines. She was an orphan. She attended the Philippine Law School. She became the first woman to graduate with a law degree from the school. She was involved in advocating for equal rights for women in the Philippines. She wrote a lecture called "The New Age for Women."  She was admitted to the bar on September 27, 1920. As a lawyer, she fought for women's rights, workers rights, and farmers rights. She died in 1929 of tuberculosis.

References

External links
Abiertas House of Friendship and Radiance School, named after Josepha Abriertas

1894 births
1929 deaths
20th-century Filipino lawyers
Filipino feminists
People from Capiz
Filipino women lawyers
Philippine Law School alumni
Visayan people
20th-century women lawyers